Wickerbach is a river of Hesse, Germany. It flows from the eastern suburbs of Wiesbaden and into the Main at Flörsheim.

See also
List of rivers of Hesse

References

Rivers of Hesse
Rivers of the Taunus
Rivers of Germany